The 1920 United States presidential election in North Carolina took place on November 2, 1920, as part of the 1920 United States presidential election, which was held throughout all contemporary forty-eight states. Voters chose twelve representatives, or electors to the Electoral College, who voted for president and vice president.

Background
Like all former Confederate states, North Carolina would during its “Redemption” develop a politics based upon Jim Crow laws, disfranchisement of its African-American population and dominance of the Democratic Party. Unlike the Deep South, the Republican Party possessed sufficient historic Unionist white support from the mountains and northwestern Piedmont to gain a stable one-third of the statewide vote total in general elections even after blacks lost the right to vote. Although with disfranchisement of blacks the state introduced a poll tax, it was less severe than other former Confederate states with the result that a greater proportion of whites participated than anywhere else in the South. Like Virginia, Tennessee and Oklahoma, the relative strength of Republican opposition meant that North Carolina did not have statewide white primaries, although certain counties did use the white primary.

Although North Carolina had never given women suffrage rights at any level of government before 1919, nor did its legislature consider the Nineteenth Amendment when it passed the Federal House and Senate, during 1920 the state passed by more a more than three-to-one margin a constitutional amendment that made it the first former Confederate state to abolish its poll tax. This amendment was first proposed as early as 1908, but was only given serious thought by the state legislature after the Sixteenth Amendment took effect in 1913 and it was recognized that North Carolina was burdened with an inefficient and regressive tax system. The abolition of the poll tax and women's suffrage, as it turned out, would cause in the Tar Heel State amongst the largest mobilizations of new voters in the Union.

Vote
Although Republican nominee Warren G. Harding had urged the state's mountain Republican legislators to ratify the Nineteenth Amendment, neither Harding nor Democratic nominee and Ohio Governor James M. Cox did any campaigning in a state which had voted Democratic at every election since 1876. However, at the end of October the GOP, sensing a landslide, believed based on an early Rexall straw poll that it had a chance of carrying North Carolina as well as Tennessee for its first victory in a former Confederate state since 1876. Later returns, however, gave Cox a larger win than Woodrow Wilson had gained in 1916. As it turned out, Cox would carry the state comfortably, and North Carolina would prove the state that most resisted the anti-Wilson trend, with Cox losing fewer than 3 percentage points on Wilson and Polk County even switching from voting for Republican Charles Evans Hughes in 1916 to voting for Cox.

Results

Results by county

Notes

References 

North Carolina
1920
1920 North Carolina elections